Broinowski is a surname of Polish origin. Notable people with the surname include:

 Alison Broinowski (born 1941), Australian academic, journalist, writer, and former diplomat
 Gracius Joseph Broinowski (1837–1913), Australian artist and ornithologist

See also
 Jacob Bronowski

Surnames of Polish origin